Dietary Reference Values (DRV) is the name of the nutritional requirements systems used by the United Kingdom Department of Health and the European Union's European Food Safety Authority.

History

Introduction in the United Kingdom 

In 1991, the United Kingdom Department of Health published the Dietary Reference Values for Food Energy and Nutrients for the United Kingdom. This records Dietary Reference Values which recommended nutritional intakes for the UK population. The DRVs can be divided into three types:

RNI - Reference Nutrient Intake (95% of the population's requirement is met)
EAR - Estimated Average Requirement (50% of the population's requirement is met)
LRNI - Lower Recommended Nutritional Intake (5% of the population's requirement is met)

RNI is not the same as RDA (Recommended Daily Allowance) or GDA, although they are often similar.

Extension to European Union 

In recent times, Dietary Reference Values are under the interest of the European Food Safety Authority too, which intend to extend them at the EU level. EFSA is the equivalent of the Food and Drug Administration (FDA) in the USA, and acts as watchdog inside the European market in order to establish a common ground on food safety requirements and nutrition as well.

EFSA met in September 2009 with representative of the Member States in order to gain their views on fats, carbohydrates, fibres and water as well as Food-Based Dietary Guidelines.
Furthermore EFSA is searching for comments (Open Consultation) by 15 October, in order to validate its assumptions on the need to have:

 carbohydrates comprising 45%–60% of the overall daily caloric intake
 fats being comprised among 20%–35% of the overall caloric intake
 fibre needs: complying with 25 grams/day

EFSA considers that there are not sufficient data to set DRVs for sugars, and not systematic scientific substantiation linking diseases such as stroke or diabetes (DMT1 or DMT2) to an increased intake of sugars (glycemic load/glycemic index).
In any case, there is much literature referring to this link, on journals with very high impact factor and statistically robust design and results

Many problems seem nowadays to derive from having integrated EU level DRV:
 the presence of a previous EFSA opinion on Food Based Dietary Guidelines, aimed at stressing the need of having only country-based guidelines, against the WHO hypothesis. This is due to very different food patterns, for EFSA, inside Europe.
 the presence of private scheme such as GDA (Guidelines on Daily Amounts), referring on the same subject (calories from nutrient groups) but casting shadow on the effectiveness of DRVs as public authorities' scheme.

Recommendations
General advice is given for healthy people using the table. The British government recommended that healthy people should eat a diet which contains plenty of starch (rice, bread, pasta and potatoes). It also recommends that a person should eat at least 5 fruit or vegetable portions each day. Meat, fish, eggs and other protein-rich foods should be eaten in moderation. Dairy products should also be moderately consumed. Finally, salt, saturated fat and sugar should be eaten least of all.

Exceptions to these rules include pregnant women and young children. Additionally, those who have little exposure to sunlight may need to take vitamin D supplementation.

Sources of energy
The Dietary Reference Values below are specified mainly for adults. They define the proportion of a person's total energy intake which should come from different components of food. These include fat and fatty acids, fibre, starch and sugars. Note that these values do not apply to children, and children younger than five with small appetites should not have such restrictions imposed.

Salt

The guideline salt intake for adults is about 6 grams of salt (approximately one teaspoon). The Food Standards Agency estimate the average salt intake is about 8.6 grams/day  (2008). A high salt diet is likely to increase the risk of high blood pressure, which is associated with an increased risk of heart attack and stroke.

Protein, vitamins and minerals

Recommendations for protein, vitamins and minerals vary by age. Where different intakes for males and females are recommended, the higher value is identified in the table below to ensure that the greatest daily needs of the group is met:

See also
 

 

Traffic light label

References

External links
 2017 Dietary Reference Values for nutrients, Summary report by the European Food Safety Authority

Nutrition